Presidential elections were held in Guinea-Bissau on 24 November 2019. As no candidate received a majority of the vote, a second round was held on 29 December. Incumbent president José Mário Vaz finished fourth in the first round of voting, failing to progress to the runoff. Umaro Sissoco Embaló won the second round with 54% of the vote.

Background
Guinea-Bissau returned to constitutional order in 2014 with the election of Vaz as president. Vaz won the 2014 presidential election as the PAIGC’s candidate but fell out with the party after he dismissed his Prime Minister Domingos Simões Pereira, leader of the PAIGC, in August 2015. During his presidency (2014-2019), Vaz has worked with seven prim-ministers – an indicator of the degree of political instability that characterises his administration. 

On 26 October 2019 violent protests followed the dismissal of Prime-Minister Aristides Gomes. Vaz met with a senior military leader as rumors of a coup took hold. On 9 November 2019, President Vaz yielded to pressure from the West African regional organization ECOWAS and the African Union and reinstated his former prime minister.

Candidates
The elections were contested by 12 candidates, including:
José Mário Vaz, incumbent president. An economist elected in 2014 as the candidate of the African Party for the Independence of Guinea and Cape Verde (PAIGC), but now running as an independent; the first president to complete his five year term in office
Gabriel Fernando Indi of the United Social Democratic Party, a former football club director
Umaro Sissoco Embaló of Madem G15, a former prime minister
Carlos Gomes Júnior, a former prime minister running as an independent
Baciro Djá of the Patriotic Front of National Salvation (FREPASNA), another former prime minister
Nuno Gomes Nabiam, an MP from the Assembly of the People United
Mamadú Iaia Djaló of the New Democracy Party, a former foreign minister.

Results

Aftermath
In the first round of voting, Domingos Simões Pereira led the field, with 40.13% of the vote. Incumbent president José Mário Vaz finished fourth in the first round of voting, failing to progress to the runoff. According to the preliminary and final results published by the national commission of elections, Umaro Sissoco Embaló won the runoff vote against Simões Pereira, 54% to 46%. Simões Pereira continues to dispute the results. Although neither the supreme court of Guinea-Bissau nor the parliament had given its approval for the official swearing-in ceremony, Sissoco Embaló had organized an alternative swearing-in ceremony in a hotel in Bissau to announce himself as legal president of Guinea-Bissau. Several politicians in Guinea-Bissau, including prime minister Aristides Gomes, accused Sissoco Embaló of arranging a Coup d'état, although outgoing president Mário Vaz stepped down to allow Embaló to take power.

Jose Mario Vaz was the President of Guinea-Bissau from 2014 until 2019 presidential elections. For two decades Jose Mario Vaz was the first elected president finished his five-year mandate. Umaro Sissoco Embaló was the winner of the election and he took office in February 2020. However he faced a last-minute stand-off with parliament before taking office. Embaló is the first president to be elected without the backing of the PAIGC. 

Embaló was inaugurated as president in a ceremony in Bissau on 27 February 2020. However, the PAIGC rejected the results, claiming there had been electoral fraud, and submitted a petition to the Supreme Court. Holding a majority in National People's Assembly, the party swore in Speaker Cipriano Cassamá as a rival president. Cassamá resigned after a day, saying he had received death threats.

Embaló appointed Nuno Gomes Nabiam as Prime Minister. However, former Prime Minister Aristides Gomes refused to resign. After Embaló, a former army general, took office, armed soldiers were deployed at all government offices and the national radio.

References

Guinea-Bissau
2019 in Guinea-Bissau
Presidential elections in Guinea-Bissau
November 2019 events in Africa